is a monorail station on the Osaka Monorail located in Settsu, Osaka, Japan.

Lines
Osaka Monorail Main Line (Station Number: 21)

Layout
There is an island platform and two tracks elevated. The platform is sealed in with glass walls and doors.

Stations next to Settsu

	

Osaka Monorail stations
Railway stations in Japan opened in 1997
Railway stations in Osaka Prefecture
Settsu, Osaka